Abu Musab may refer to:

 Ahmad Fadeel al-Nazal al-Khalayleh, also known as Abu Musab al-Zarqawi
 Mustafa Setmariam Nasar, also known as Abu Musab al-Suri
 Mohamedou Ould Salahi, Mauritanian former detainee at the Guantánamo Bay detention camp